Marcos Patricio Barraza Gómez (born 25 March 1973) is a Chilean politician who is a member of the Chilean Constitutional Convention.

He was minister of Michelle Bachelet's second government.

References

External links
 

Living people
1973 births
People from Santiago
University of Santiago, Chile alumni
University of Chile alumni
21st-century Chilean politicians
Communist Party of Chile politicians
Members of the Chilean Constitutional Convention
Government ministers of Chile
People from Antofagasta Region